Lothar Schlapp (born 2 October 1960) is a former professional German footballer.

Schlapp made 25 appearances in the 2. Fußball-Bundesliga for Tennis Borussia Berlin during his playing career.

References 
 

1960 births
Living people
German footballers
Association football midfielders
2. Bundesliga players
SSV Ulm 1846 players
Tennis Borussia Berlin players